The 2023 Paris–Nice was a road cycling stage race that took place between 5 and 12 March 2023 in France. It was the 81st edition of Paris–Nice and the sixth race of the 2023 UCI World Tour.

Teams
All 18 UCI WorldTeams and four UCI ProTeams made up the 22 teams that participated in the race.

UCI WorldTeams

 
 
 
 
 
 
 
 
 
 
 
 
 
 
 
 
 
 

UCI ProTeams

Route

Stages

Stage 1 
5 March 2023 — La Verrière to La Verrière,

Stage 2 
6 March 2023 – Bazainville to Fontainebleau,

Stage 3 
7 March 2023 – Dampierre-en-Burly to Dampierre-en-Burly,  (TTT)

Stage 4 
8 March 2023 – Saint-Amand-Montrond to La Loge des Gardes,

Stage 5 
9 March 2023 – Saint-Symphorien-sur-Coise to Saint-Paul-Trois-Châteaux,

Stage 6 
10 March 2023 – Tourves to La Colle-sur-Loup, 
Stage cancelled to due dangerously high wind speeds in the area.

Stage 7 

Stage 8 
12 March 2023 – Nice to Nice,

Classification leadership table

Classification standings

General classification

Points classification

Mountains classification

Young rider classification

Team classification

Notes

References

External links
 

2023
Paris–Nice
Paris–Nice
Paris–Nice